Tomás Díaz Mendoza (born April 9, 1965) is a Mexican professional wrestler, better known by his ring name Villano IV (Villano Cuarto). Within the stable Los Villanos, he has wrestled for Universal Wrestling Association (UWA), AAA, and World Championship Wrestling (WCW). While popular and successful in Mexico, he frequently performed as a jobber in WCW. The other sons of Ray Mendoza who have used the name "Villano" include Villano I, Villano II, Villano III (Arturo Díaz Mendoza), and Villano V (Raymundo Diaz Mendoza).

Professional wrestling career
Díaz began wrestling in 1982 after being taught by his father and his older brother Arturo. He was not given the Villano name on his debut, both his father and his older brothers wanted him to get a college degree and also earn some in-ring experience before he would be allowed to use the Villano name. He spent the first couple of years in wrestling working as various enmascarado characters such as Leopardo Negro III and Super Maquina Jr.

Villano IV
In 1983, Díaz was finally given the mask and the name of his brothers and became Villano IV. He immediately began teaming with his brothers, especially Villano I and Villano V, and engaged in a heated and very popular feud with the trios team of Los Brazos (Brazo de Plata, Brazo de Oro. and El Brazo). On October 21, 1988, Villano I, IV, and V defeated Los Brazos in a Lucha de Apuesta, Mask Vs Mask match and thus unmasked Los Brazos. Over the years Villano IV and his brothers have worked for Universal Wrestling Association (UWA), AAA and Consejo Mundial de Lucha Libre (CMLL) and with shorter runs with International Wrestling Revolution Group (IWRG) and World Wrestling Association holding tag team and Trios titles in all federations.

World Championship Wrestling (1996–2000)
Villano IV and V began working for World Championship Wrestling (WCW) as part of the influx of luchadors in 1996. Villano IV made his debut at the 1996 World War 3 event as part of the Three Ring, 60 man battle royal. Subsequently, Los Villanos worked mainly the weekend shows such as WCW World Wide and WCW Saturday Night. The brothers played the role of a heel and would occasionally cheat by switching places while the referee was distracted (all Villanos wore identical attire, aside from their Roman numeral distinctions). Los Villanos made a couple of appearances on WCW's main shows and PPVs such as Villano IV teaming with Konnan and La Parka to defeat Juventud Guerrera, Ciclope, and Super Calo at SuperBrawl VII. They also worked an eight-man tag match at Clash of the Champions XXXV, alongside Psychosis and Silver King against Juventud Guerrera, Super Calo, Héctor Garza and Lizmark Jr. Villano IV also wrestled in WCW, unmasked, under the ring name "Ray Mendoza Jr." (in honor of his father), many years before his brother Villano V began using the ring name in Mexico.

Mexico (2000–present)
Following their stint in WCW Los Villanos returned full-time to Mexico where they began working for Consejo Mundial de Lucha Libre (CMLL). Villano IV and V assisted their brother in the build-up of a storyline between Villano III and Atlantis, a storyline that reached back to 1999, while Villano IV and V were still working for WCW. The two brothers were in the corner of Villano III as he put his mask on the line against Atlantis in a Lucha de Apuesta at the 2000 Jucio Final final show. On the night Atlantis defeated and unmasked Villano III, the first Villano to be unmasked in the ring. Over the following years Los Villanos worked both for CMLL and made appearances on the Mexican Independent circuit. In 2008 Villano IV acted as the cornerman for his older brother Villano V as he began a feud with CMLL luchador Blue Panther. Villano IV was the cornerman for V's biggest Apuesta win as he defeated and unmasked Blue Panther as part of the CMLL 75th Anniversary Show. He was also heavily involved in V's storyline with Último Guerrero in the early 2009, and watched as Villano V was unmasked by Guerrero after an Apuesta match at the 2009 Homenaje a Dos Leyendas. While Villano V works regularly for CMLL both Villano III and Villano IV take more independent bookings. On March 12, 2013, AAA announced that Villano IV would be returning to the promotion five days later at Rey de Reyes. This would mark his first appearance for AAA since 1996. On March 16, 2013, he teamed up with older brother Ray Mendoza Jr. to compete in a Ruleta de la Muerte, losers advance tag team tournament to commemorate the retirement of Ray Mendoza Jr. The duo lost to Mil Máscaras and El Mesias in the first round and lost to El Texano Jr. and Super Nova in the second round, qualifying them for the finals where the losing team would be forced to either unmask (Villano IV) or have their hair shaved off (Mendoza Jr.). The team faced, and defeated, the team of Hijo de Pirata Morgan and Cassandro which meant Hijo de Pirata Morgan had to unmask and reveal his birthname, Antheus Ortiz Chávez, while Cassandro had all his hair shaved off as is traditional with Luchas de Apuestas losses. The following day, Villano IV returned to AAA to take part in the 2013 Rey de Reyes tournament. He was the last man eliminated by L.A. Park in his six-way semifinal match, which also included Chessman, Drago, Jack Evans, and Psicosis. On October 15, 2022, Villano IV lost a mask vs. mask match to Pentagon Jr. at Triplemanía XXX, forcing him to unmask after nearly forty years.

Personal life
Tomás Díaz Mendoza is the fifth son and eighth and last child overall of José Díaz Velazquez and Lupita Mendoza. His brothers, like himself all became luchadors: José de Jesús (Villano I), José Alfredo (Villano II), Arturo (Villano III), Raymundo (Villano V) and Tomás. Lupita Mendoza died in 1986, his second oldest brother José Alfredo died in 1989, his oldest brother José de Jesús died in 2001, and his father José Diaz died on April 16, 2003. Díaz was adamant that his sons get a good education instead of becoming wrestlers, wishing that they become lawyers or doctors as he wanted to spare them the physical suffering he experienced himself. Once he realized that his two oldest sons had begun wrestling under masks he agreed to train them and help their wrestling careers. He was also instrumental in training his youngest two sons, although he insisted they both get college degrees before they were allowed to begin wrestling. Since Tomás finished his education first he became known as "Villano IV", while Raymundo, the second youngest son, became "Villano V".

Championships and accomplishments
Asistencia Asesoría y Administración / AAA
AAA Americas Trios Championship (2 times) – with Villano III and Villano V
Mexican National Atómicos Championship (1 time) – with Villano III, Villano V, and Pierroth Jr.
Consejo Mundial de Lucha Libre
Mexican National Trios Championship (1 time) – with Dos Caras and Villano III
Torneo Gran Alternativa: (2003) – with Alan Stone
International Wrestling Revolution Group
IWRG Intercontinental Heavyweight Championship (1 time)
IWRG Intercontinental Trios Championship (1 time) – with Villano III and Villano V
Rock y Lucha Championship (1 time)
Pro Wrestling Illustrated
PWI ranked him # 142 of the 500 best singles wrestlers of the PWI 500 in 2001.
Universal Wrestling Association
UWA World Tag Team Championship (3 times) – with Villano V
UWA World Trios Championship (4 times) – with Villano I and Villano V (4)
Naucalpan Tag Team Championship (1 time) – with Kuroneko
Universal Wrestling Entertainment
UWE Tag Team Championship (1 time) – with Ray Mendoza Jr.
World Wrestling Association
WWA World Junior Light Heavyweight Championship (1 time)
WWA World Tag Team Championship (1 time) – with Villano V
WWA World Trios Championship (1 time) – with Villano III and Villano V
Wrestling Observer Newsletter
Worst Match of the Year (2015) with Villano III and Villano V vs. Monster Clown, Murder Clown and Psycho Clown on August 9

Luchas de Apuestas record

Footnotes

References

Living people
Masked wrestlers
Mexican male professional wrestlers
Professional wrestlers from Baja California
Sportspeople from Tijuana
1965 births
Mexican National Atómicos Champions
Mexican National Trios Champions
20th-century professional wrestlers
21st-century professional wrestlers
UWA World Trios Champions
UWA World Tag Team Champions